Remetea is a commune in Bihor County, Crișana, Romania. It is composed of five villages: Drăgoteni (Drágota), Meziad (Mézged), Petreasa (Petrász), Remetea, and Șoimuș (Gyepüsolymos).

Geography
The commune is located in the southern part of the county, at the edge of the Apuseni Mountains, in the foothills of the Pădurea Craiului Mountains. It lies on the banks of the Valea Roșie River, a tributary of the Crișul Negru; the Meziad River flows into the Valea Roșie in Remetea.

Remetea is crossed by county road DJ764, which joins Beiuș to the town of Aleșd; county road DJ764C connects the commune to Meziad village to the east.

Population
According to the 2011 census, the commune has a population of 2,906 inhabitants. The population structure is: Romanians 76.67%, Hungarians 15.79%, Roma 5.71%, and others 1.69%. The percentage of Hungarians is higher in Remetea village.

Natives
  (1882–1919), deputy at the Great National Assembly of Alba Iulia
 Marțian Dan (1935–2002), politician and university professor
 Károly Fila (born 1996), footballer

References

Communes in Bihor County
Localities in Crișana